Ida Krehm (February 24, 1912 – August 12, 1998) was a Canadian-American pianist. She began playing the piano at the age of seven and studied at the Hamburg Conservatory. Krehm earned recognition as an orchestral soloist and recitalist with various symphony orchestras in the Americas and Europe. She also performed the role of a conductor-pianist and recorded the works of various composers. The Ida Krehm Memorial Scholarship was setup by her family at The Royal Conservatory of Music.

Early life and education
On February 24, 1912, Krehm was born in Toronto, Canada. Her parents were modest Russian Jewish immigrants who had no background in music. Krehm had one younger brother. She had early ambitions not centred around music and liked doing school work and doing watercolour and drawing. Artistry was discouraged by Krehm's parents and she spent more time doing music. When she turned seven years old, she began playing the piano and went to study under Norah Drewett de Kresz, Ernest Farmer and Viggo Kihl as well as theory with Healey Willan at the Hambourg Conservatory. Krehm also did heavy training in harmony following advice by Granville Bantock.

Career
Upon first experiencing playing to a large audience, Krehm became further inclined to play music. From the ages of eleven to thirteen, she won each of the Canadian national competitions such as the Canadian National Exhibition three times (1923, 1924 and 1925) as well as the Ontario Musical Festival and the Welsh Eisteddfod in 1923 and 1924. Krehm made her first public concert appearance at a newspaper contest at Bloor St. United Church in 1924, and began teaching at age 13. She became a resident of the United States in 1929, moving to the Chicago Musical Institute to study under the Swiss conductor and pianist Rudolph Ganz.

Krehm won three national accolades over the course of three weeks in 1937. She earned the Schubert Memorial Award by making three appearances alongside the Philadelphia Orchestra, the cash prize of the National Federation of Music Clubs, and the Walter W. Naumburg Foundation Award on her debut in New York City at The Town Hall in December 1937. Krehm's professional debut in Canada came at the Hart House in the University of Toronto for the Women's Musical Club of Toronto on March 2, 1939.

She went on to earn more recognition as an orchestral soloist and a recitalist in the Americas with the Chicago Symphony Orchestra, the Cleveland Orchestra, the Detroit Symphony Orchestra, the Guatemala National Symphony Orchestra, the St. Louis Symphony Orchestra, the Toronto Symphony Orchestra, and in Europe with the London Philharmonic Orchestra and the Zurich Radio Orchestra. Krehm was made Bloch's selected soloist for the of his Scherzo fantasque with the Chicago Symphony Orchestra on December 2, 1950, and was the introducer of works by Jiri Antonin Benda, Norman Dello Joio, M.K. Čiurlionis, Rudolph Ganz, Carlos Surinach, Alexandre Tansman and Alexander Tcherepnin.

In 1962, Krehm made her debut as a pianist-conductor in Hilversum, the Netherlands and went on to repeat this role with London's English Chamber Orchestra and Melos Ensemble and the CBC Symphony Orchestra in Toronto. She also performed this role in Berlin, Trondheim in Norway and at the 1976 Oriveto Festival. Krehm commissioned the 1977 Concertino by Srul Irving Glick she wrote for her to play on the keyboard. She recorded the works of various composers such as Robert Schumann, Pyotr Ilyich Tchaikovsky, Alexander Scriabin among others.

Personal life
She was married to Joseph Richard Pick from 1936 until his death from getting an overdose of radioactive iodine in 1955. On August 12, 1998, Krehm died from cardiac arrest in San José, Costa Rica. She was buried in the country and a memorial service was held for her at the St. George's Society of Toronto on August 30.

Character and legacy
Wilson L. Taylor in 1938 described Krehm as having "a trim figure" and "a pleasant personality". Reed Hynds wrote of Krehm's playing technique: "She had a comprehensive technique which expressed itself in flying fingers under rigid control, a sense of total color which was capable of minute dynamic adjustments, and an intellectual grasp which kept every phrase subordinate to her conception of the work as a whole."

According to Betty Nygaard King and Eleanor Kodofsky in Krehm's entry in The Canadian Encyclopedia, the pianist's work was identified "by high competence and a questing intelligence". The Ida Krehm Memorial Scholarship was setup by her family at The Royal Conservatory of Music. She was profiled on CBC Radio in March 1999.

References

1912 births
1998 deaths
20th-century Canadian women musicians
20th-century classical pianists
Canadian classical pianists
Canadian expatriate musicians in the United States
Canadian expatriates in Costa Rica
Canadian people of Russian-Jewish descent
Canadian women pianists
Musicians from Toronto
Naturalized citizens of the United States
Women classical pianists
20th-century women pianists